Elliot Collier (born 22 February 1995) is a New Zealand professional soccer player who plays as a forward for San Diego Loyal and the New Zealand national team.

Career 
After spending time in his native New Zealand playing semi-professionally, Collier moved to the United States to play college soccer at Loyola University Chicago. Collier played four years with the Ramblers, scoring 15 goals and tallying 11 assists in 69 appearances.

Collier also appeared for USL PDL sides Chicago FC United and Michigan Bucks.

Chicago Fire 
On 21 January 2018, Collier was selected with the 49th overall pick of the 2018 MLS SuperDraft by the Chicago Fire. Collier signed with the club on 28 February 2018.

Collier made his professional debut on 10 March 2018 as an 88th-minute substitute during a 3–4 loss to Sporting Kansas City.

Following the 2021 season, Collier's contract option was declined by Chicago.

Collier signed with San Antonio FC in the USL Championship on January 7, 2022.

On 27 December 2022, it was announced that Collier would play the 2023 season with San Diego Loyal in the USL Championship.

Career statistics

Club

References

External links 

 
 

1995 births
Living people
Association football forwards
Chicago FC United players
Chicago Fire FC draft picks
Chicago Fire FC players
Indy Eleven players
Memphis 901 FC players
Loyola Ramblers men's soccer players
Major League Soccer players
Flint City Bucks players
San Antonio FC players
San Diego Loyal SC players
New Zealand association footballers
New Zealand international footballers
Sportspeople from Hamilton, New Zealand
USL League Two players
New Zealand expatriate sportspeople in the United States